Edward Roberts Cassatt (April 14, 1839 – June 26, 1907) was an American politician.

Cassatt was born on April 14, 1839, in Wabash County, Indiana. He attended Indiana common schools and first moved to Iowa in 1857, where he enrolled at Central University in Pella. He returned to Indiana to read law with judge John W. Petit, then was admitted to the bar in Knoxville, Iowa, in 1868. Cassatt worked alongside Jairus Edward Neal, whose daughter Emily he married in 1860. Due to health concerns, Cassatt abandoned the practice of law and became a miller. Subsequently, Cassatt helped establish the First National Bank of Pella and the  Marion County National Bank in Knoxville. From 1884 to 1892, Casatt served in the Iowa Senate from District 15 as a Democrat.

Following his two terms as state senator, Cassatt became dependent on alcohol and morphine, and lost nearly $250,000 investing in wheat on the Chicago Board of Trade. Smaller transactions were processed in Des Moines. The First National Bank of Pella also lost money. Arraigned on charges of embezzlement, Cassatt attempted suicide on June 3, 1895, by cutting his throat and pouring poison into the resulting wounds.  He was found guilty of violating banking laws. On July 15, 1895, Cassatt was sentenced to nine years imprisonment by John Simson Woolson, of which he served a portion in Anamosa, Iowa, before he was pardoned by President William McKinley in 1900. In later life, Cassatt moved to Albert Lea, Minnesota, where he died on June 26, 1907, from a stomach issue. He was buried in Pella's Oak Wood (or Oakland) Cemetery.

References

1839 births
1907 deaths
19th-century American politicians
Democratic Party Iowa state senators
American bank presidents
Iowa lawyers
19th-century American lawyers
Politicians convicted of embezzlement
American politicians convicted of fraud
People from Knoxville, Iowa
People from Pella, Iowa
People from Wabash County, Indiana
People from Albert Lea, Minnesota
Central College (Iowa) alumni
Recipients of American presidential clemency
American lawyers admitted to the practice of law by reading law
Burials in Iowa
Millers
Iowa politicians convicted of crimes